The wolf (Canis lupus; : wolves), also known as the gray wolf or grey wolf, is a large canine native to Eurasia and North America. More than thirty subspecies of Canis lupus have been recognized, including the dog and dingo, though gray wolves, as popularly understood, only comprise naturally-occurring wild subspecies. The wolf is the largest extant member of the family Canidae, and is further distinguished from other Canis species by its less pointed ears and muzzle, as well as a shorter torso and a longer tail. The wolf is nonetheless related closely enough to smaller Canis species, such as the coyote and the golden jackal, to produce fertile hybrids with them. The wolf's fur is usually mottled white, brown, gray, and black, although subspecies in the arctic region may be nearly all white.

Of all members of the genus Canis, the wolf is most specialized for cooperative game hunting as demonstrated by its physical adaptations to tackling large prey, its more social nature, and its highly advanced expressive behaviour, including individual or group howling. It travels in nuclear families consisting of a mated pair accompanied by their offspring. Offspring may leave to form their own packs on the onset of sexual maturity and in response to competition for food within the pack. Wolves are also territorial, and fights over territory are among the principal causes of mortality. The wolf is mainly a carnivore and feeds on large wild hooved mammals as well as smaller animals, livestock, carrion, and garbage. Single wolves or mated pairs typically have higher success rates in hunting than do large packs. Pathogens and parasites, notably rabies virus, may infect wolves.

The global wild wolf population was estimated to be 300,000 in 2003 and is considered to be of Least Concern by the International Union for Conservation of Nature (IUCN). Wolves have a long history of interactions with humans, having been despised and hunted in most pastoral communities because of their attacks on livestock, while conversely being respected in some agrarian and hunter-gatherer societies. The wolf is also considered the ancestor of the domestic dog. Although the fear of wolves exists in many human societies, the majority of recorded attacks on people have been attributed to animals suffering from rabies. Wolf attacks on humans are rare because wolves are relatively few, live away from people, and have developed a fear of humans because of their experiences with hunters, farmers, ranchers, and shepherds.

Etymology 

The English "wolf" stems from the Old English , which is itself thought to be derived from the Proto-Germanic . The Proto-Indo-European root * may also be the source of the Latin word for the animal lupus (*). The name "gray wolf" refers to the grayish colour of the species.

Since pre-Christian times, Germanic peoples such as the Anglo-Saxons took on wulf as a prefix or suffix in their names. Examples include Wulfhere ("Wolf Army"), Cynewulf ("Royal Wolf"), Cēnwulf ("Bold Wolf"), Wulfheard ("Wolf-hard"), Earnwulf ("Eagle Wolf"), Wulfstān ("Wolf Stone") Æðelwulf ("Noble Wolf"), Wolfhroc ("Wolf-Frock"), Wolfhetan ("Wolf Hide"), Scrutolf ("Garb Wolf"), Wolfgang ("Wolf Gait") and Wolfdregil ("Wolf Runner").

Taxonomy 

In 1758, the Swedish botanist and zoologist Carl Linnaeus published in his Systema Naturae the binomial nomenclature. Canis is the Latin word meaning "dog", and under this genus he listed the doglike carnivores including domestic dogs, wolves, and jackals. He classified the domestic dog as Canis familiaris, and the wolf as Canis lupus. Linnaeus considered the dog to be a separate species from the wolf because of its "cauda recurvata" (upturning tail) which is not found in any other canid.

Evolution 

The phylogenetic descent of the extant wolf C. lupus from C. etruscus through C. mosbachensis is widely accepted. The earliest fossils of C. lupus were found in what was once eastern Beringia at Old Crow, Yukon, Canada, and at Cripple Creek Sump, Fairbanks, Alaska. The age is not agreed upon but could date to one million years ago. Considerable morphological diversity existed among wolves by the Late Pleistocene. They had more robust skulls and teeth than modern wolves, often with a shortened snout, a pronounced development of the temporalis muscle, and robust premolars. It is proposed that these features were specialized adaptations for the processing of carcass and bone associated with the hunting and scavenging of Pleistocene megafauna. Compared with modern wolves, some Pleistocene wolves showed an increase in tooth breakage similar to that seen in the extinct dire wolf. This suggests they either often processed carcasses, or that they competed with other carnivores and needed to consume their prey quickly. Compared with those found in the modern spotted hyena, the frequency and location of tooth fractures in these wolves indicates they were habitual bone crackers.

Genomic studies suggest modern wolves and dogs descend from a common ancestral wolf population that existed 20,000 years ago. A 2021 study found that the Himalayan wolf and the Indian plains wolf are part of a lineage that is basal to other wolves and split from them 200,000 years ago. Other wolves appear to have originated in Beringia in an expansion that was driven by the huge ecological changes during the close of the Late Pleistocene. A study in 2016 indicates that a population bottleneck was followed by a rapid radiation from an ancestral population at a time during, or just after, the Last Glacial Maximum. This implies the original morphologically diverse wolf populations were out-competed and replaced by more modern wolves.

A 2016 genomic study suggests that Old World and New World wolves split around 12,500 years ago followed by the divergence of the lineage that led to dogs from other Old World wolves around 11,100–12,300 years ago. An extinct Late Pleistocene wolf may have been the ancestor of the dog, with the dog's similarity to the extant wolf being the result of genetic admixture between the two. The dingo, Basenji, Tibetan Mastiff and Chinese indigenous breeds are basal members of the domestic dog clade. The divergence time for wolves in Europe, the Middle East, and Asia is estimated to be fairly recent at around 1,600 years ago. Among New World wolves, the Mexican wolf diverged around 5,400 years ago.

Subspecies 

In the third edition of Mammal Species of the World published in 2005, the mammalogist W. Christopher Wozencraft listed under C. lupus 36 wild subspecies, and proposed two additional subspecies: familiaris (Linnaeus, 1758) and dingo (Meyer, 1793). Wozencraft included hallstromi—the New Guinea singing dog—as a taxonomic synonym for the dingo. Wozencraft referred to a 1999 mitochondrial DNA (mtDNA) study as one of the guides in forming his decision, and listed the 38 subspecies of C. lupus under the biological common name of "wolf", the nominate subspecies being the Eurasian wolf (C. l. lupus) based on the type specimen that Linnaeus studied in Sweden. Studies using paleogenomic techniques reveal that the modern wolf and the dog are sister taxa, as modern wolves are not closely related to the population of wolves that was first domesticated. In 2019, a workshop hosted by the IUCN/Species Survival Commission's Canid Specialist Group considered the New Guinea singing dog and the dingo to be feral Canis familiaris, and therefore should not be assessed for the IUCN Red List.

Admixture with other canids 

In the distant past, there has been gene flow between African wolves, golden jackals, and gray wolves. The African wolf is a descendant of a genetically admixed canid of 72% wolf and 28% Ethiopian wolf ancestry. One African wolf from the Egyptian Sinai Peninsula shows admixture with Middle Eastern gray wolves and dogs. There is evidence of gene flow between golden jackals and Middle Eastern wolves, less so with European and Asian wolves, and least with North American wolves. This indicates the golden jackal ancestry found in North American wolves may have occurred before the divergence of the Eurasian and North American wolves.

The common ancestor of the coyote and the wolf has admixed with a ghost population of an extinct unidentified canid. This canid is genetically close to the dhole and evolved after the divergence of the African hunting dog from the other canid species. The basal position of the coyote compared to the wolf is proposed to be due to the coyote retaining more of the mitochondrial genome of this unidentified canid. Similarly, a museum specimen of a wolf from southern China collected in 1963 showed a genome that was 12–14% admixed from this unknown canid. In North America, most coyotes and wolves show varying degrees of past genetic admixture.

In more recent times, some male Italian wolves originated from dog ancestry, which indicates female wolves will breed with male dogs in the wild. In the Caucasus Mountains, ten percent of dogs including livestock guardian dogs, are first generation hybrids. Although mating between golden jackals and wolves has never been observed, evidence of jackal-wolf hybridization was discovered through mitochondrial DNA analysis of jackals living in the Caucasus Mountains and in Bulgaria.

In 2021, a genetic study found that the dog's similarity to the extant gray wolf was the result of substantial dog-into-wolf gene flow, with almost negligible wolf-into-dog gene flow since the dog's domestication. Some gray wolves were related to all ancient and modern dogs.

Description 

The wolf is the largest extant member of the Canidae family, and is further distinguished from coyotes and jackals by a broader snout, shorter ears, a shorter torso and a longer tail. It is slender and powerfully built, with a large, deeply descending rib cage, a sloping back, and a heavily muscled neck. The wolf's legs are moderately longer than those of other canids, which enables the animal to move swiftly, and to overcome the deep snow that covers most of its geographical range in winter. The ears are relatively small and triangular. The wolf's head is large and heavy, with a wide forehead, strong jaws and a long, blunt muzzle. The teeth are heavy and large, making them better suited to crushing bone than those of other canids. They are not as specialized as those found in hyenas though. Its molars have a flat chewing surface, but not to the same extent as the coyote, whose diet contains more vegetable matter. Females tend to have narrower muzzles and foreheads, thinner necks, slightly shorter legs, and less massive shoulders than males.

The size and weight of the modern wolf increases proportionally with latitude in accord with Bergmann's rule. On average, European wolves weigh , North American wolves , and Indian and Arabian wolves . Females in any given wolf population typically weigh  less than males.

Pelage 

The wolf has very dense and fluffy winter fur, with a short undercoat and long, coarse guard hairs. Most of the undercoat and some guard hairs are shed in spring and grow back in autumn. The longest hairs occur on the back, particularly on the front quarters and neck. Especially long hairs grow on the shoulders and almost form a crest on the upper part of the neck. The hairs on the cheeks are elongated and form tufts. The ears are covered in short hairs and project from the fur. Short, elastic and closely adjacent hairs are present on the limbs from the elbows down to the calcaneal tendons. The winter fur is highly resistant to the cold. Wolf fur provides better insulation than dog fur and does not collect ice when warm breath is condensed against it.

In cold climates, the wolf can reduce the flow of blood near its skin to conserve body heat. The warmth of the foot pads is regulated independently from the rest of the body and is maintained at just above tissue-freezing point where the pads come in contact with ice and snow. In warm climates, the fur is coarser and scarcer than in northern wolves. Female wolves tend to have smoother furred limbs than males and generally develop the smoothest overall coats as they age. Older wolves generally have more white hairs on the tip of the tail, along the nose, and on the forehead. Winter fur is retained longest by lactating females, although with some hair loss around their teats.

A wolf's coat colour is determined by its guard hairs. Wolves usually have some hairs that are white, brown, gray and black. The coat of the Eurasian wolf is a mixture of ochreous (yellow to orange) and rusty ochreous (orange/red/brown) colours with light gray. The muzzle is pale ochreous gray, and the area of the lips, cheeks, chin, and throat is white. The top of the head, forehead, under and between the eyes, and between the eyes and ears is gray with a reddish film. The neck is ochreous. Long, black tips on the hairs along the back form a broad stripe, with black hair tips on the shoulders, upper chest and rear of the body. The sides of the body, tail, and outer limbs are a pale dirty ochreous colour, while the inner sides of the limbs, belly, and groin are white. Apart from those wolves which are pure white or black, these tones vary little across geographical areas, although the patterns of these colours vary between individuals.

In North America, the coat colours of wolves follow Gloger's rule, wolves in the Canadian arctic being white and those in southern Canada, the U.S., and Mexico being predominantly gray. In some areas of the Rocky Mountains of Alberta and British Columbia, the coat colour is predominantly black, some being blue-gray and some with silver and black. Differences in coat colour between sexes is absent in Eurasia; females tend to have redder tones in North America. Black-coloured wolves in North America acquired their colour from wolf-dog admixture after the first arrival of dogs across the Bering Strait 12,000 to 14,000 years ago. Research into the inheritance of white colour from dogs into wolves has yet to be undertaken.

Ecology

Distribution and habitat 

Wolves occur across Eurasia and North America. However, deliberate human persecution because of livestock predation and fear of attacks on humans has reduced the wolf's range to about one-third of its historic range; the wolf is now extirpated (locally extinct) from much of its range in Western Europe, the United States and Mexico, and completely in Ireland, the United Kingdom, and Japan. In modern times, the wolf occurs mostly in wilderness and remote areas. Wolves live in forests, inland wetlands, shrublands, grasslands (including Arctic tundra), pastures, deserts, and rocky peaks on mountains. Habitat use by wolves depends on the abundance of prey, snow conditions, livestock densities, road densities, human presence and topography.

Diet 

Like all land mammals that are pack hunters, the wolf feeds predominantly on wild herbivorous hoofed mammals that can be divided into large size  and medium size , and have a body mass similar to that of the combined mass of the pack members. The wolf specializes in preying on the vulnerable individuals of large prey, with a pack of 15 able to bring down an adult moose. The variation in diet between wolves living on different continents is based on the variety of hoofed mammals and of available smaller and domesticated prey.

In North America, the wolf's diet is dominated by wild large hoofed mammals (ungulates) and medium-sized mammals. In Asia and Europe, their diet is dominated by wild medium-sized hoofed mammals and domestic species. The wolf depends on wild species, and if these are not readily available, as in Asia, the wolf is more reliant on domestic species. Across Eurasia, wolves prey mostly on moose, red deer, roe deer and wild boar. In North America, important range-wide prey are elk, moose, caribou, white-tailed deer and mule deer. They also prey on bison and muskoxen. Wolves can digest their meal in a few hours and can feed several times in one day, making quick use of large quantities of meat. A well-fed wolf stores fat under the skin, around the heart, intestines, kidneys, and bone marrow, particularly during the autumn and winter.

Nonetheless, wolves are not fussy eaters. Smaller-sized animals that may supplement their diet include rodents, rabbits, hares, insectivores and smaller carnivores. They frequently eat waterfowl and their eggs. When such foods are insufficient, they prey on lizards, snakes, frogs, and large insects when available. Wolves in northern Minnesota prey on northern pike in freshwater streams. The diet of coastal wolves in Alaska includes 20% salmon, while those of coastal wolves in British Columbia includes 25% marine sources, and those on the nearby islands 75%.

In Europe, wolves eat apples, pears, figs, melons, berries and cherries. In North America, wolves eat blueberries and raspberries. Wolves also eat grass, which may provide some vitamins, but is most likely used mainly to induce vomiting to rid themselves of intestinal parasites or long guard hairs. They are known to eat the berries of mountain-ash, lily of the valley, bilberries, cowberries, European black nightshade, grain crops, and the shoots of reeds.

In times of scarcity, wolves will readily eat carrion. In Eurasian areas with dense human activity, many wolf populations are forced to subsist largely on livestock and garbage. As prey in North America continue to occupy suitable habitats with low human density, North American wolves eat livestock and garbage only in dire circumstances. Cannibalism is not uncommon in wolves during harsh winters, when packs often attack weak or injured wolves and may eat the bodies of dead pack members.

Interactions with other predators 

Wolves typically dominate other canid species in areas where they both occur. In North America, incidents of wolves killing coyotes are common, particularly in winter, when coyotes feed on wolf kills. Wolves may attack coyote den sites, digging out and killing their pups, though rarely eating them. There are no records of coyotes killing wolves, though coyotes may chase wolves if they outnumber them. According to a press release by the U.S. Department of Agriculture in 1921, the infamous Custer Wolf relied on coyotes to accompany him and warn him of danger. Though they fed from his kills, he never allowed them to approach him. Interactions have been observed in Eurasia between wolves and golden jackals, the latter's numbers being comparatively small in areas with high wolf densities. Wolves also kill red, Arctic and corsac foxes, usually in disputes over carcasses, sometimes eating them.

Brown bears typically dominate wolf packs in disputes over carcasses, while wolf packs mostly prevail against bears when defending their den sites. Both species kill each other's young. Wolves eat the brown bears they kill, while brown bears seem to eat only young wolves. Wolf interactions with American black bears are much rarer because of differences in habitat preferences. Wolves have been recorded on numerous occasions actively seeking out American black bears in their dens and killing them without eating them. Unlike brown bears, American black bears frequently lose against wolves in disputes over kills. Wolves also dominate and sometimes kill wolverines, and will chase off those that attempt to scavenge from their kills. Wolverines escape from wolves in caves or up trees.

Wolves may interact and compete with felids, such as the Eurasian lynx, which may feed on smaller prey where wolves are present and may be suppressed by large wolf populations. Wolves encounter cougars along portions of the Rocky Mountains and adjacent mountain ranges. Wolves and cougars typically avoid encountering each other by hunting at different elevations for different prey (niche partitioning). In winter, when snow accumulation forces their prey into valleys, interactions between the two species become more likely. Wolves in packs usually dominate cougars and can steal their kills or even kill them, while one-to-one encounters tend to be dominated by the cat. There are several documented cases of cougars killing wolves. Wolves more broadly affect cougar population dynamics and distribution by dominating territory and prey opportunities and disrupting the feline's behaviour. Wolf and Siberian tiger interactions are well-documented in the Russian Far East, where tigers significantly depress wolf numbers, sometimes to the point of localized extinction. Only human depletion of tiger numbers appears to protect wolves from competitive exclusion from them. With perhaps only four proven records of tigers killing wolves, these cases are rare; attacks appear to be competitive rather than predatory in nature.

In Israel, Palestine, Central Asia and India wolves may encounter striped hyenas, usually in disputes over carcasses. Striped hyenas feed extensively on wolf-killed carcasses in areas where the two species interact. One-to-one, hyenas dominate wolves, and may prey on them, but wolf packs can drive off single or outnumbered hyenas. There is at least one case in Israel of a hyena associating and cooperating with a wolf pack. It is proposed that the hyena could benefit from the wolves' superior ability to hunt large, agile prey. The wolves could benefit from the hyena's superior sense of smell, to locate and dig out tortoises, to crack open large bones, and to tear open discarded food containers like tin cans.

Behaviour

Social structure 

The wolf is a social animal. Its populations consist of packs and lone wolves, most lone wolves being temporarily alone while they disperse from packs to form their own or join another one. The wolf's basic social unit is the nuclear family consisting of a mated pair accompanied by their offspring. The average pack size in North America is eight wolves and in Europe 5.5 wolves. The average pack across Eurasia consists of a family of eight wolves (two adults, juveniles, and yearlings), or sometimes two or three such families, with examples of exceptionally large packs consisting of up to 42 wolves being known. Cortisol levels in wolves rise significantly when a pack member dies, indicating the presence of stress. During times of prey abundance caused by calving or migration, different wolf packs may join together temporarily.

Offspring typically stay in the pack for 10–54 months before dispersing. Triggers for dispersal include the onset of sexual maturity and competition within the pack for food. A new pack is usually founded by an unrelated dispersing male and female, travelling together in search of an area devoid of other hostile packs. Wolf packs rarely adopt other wolves into their fold and typically kill them. In the rare cases where other wolves are adopted, the adoptee is almost invariably an immature animal of one to three years old, and unlikely to compete for breeding rights with the mated pair. This usually occurs between the months of February and May. Adoptee males may mate with an available pack female and then form their own pack. In some cases, a lone wolf is adopted into a pack to replace a deceased breeder.

Wolves are territorial and generally establish territories far larger than they require to survive assuring a steady supply of prey. Territory size depends largely on the amount of prey available and the age of the pack's pups. They tend to increase in size in areas with low prey populations, or when the pups reach the age of six months when they have the same nutritional needs as adults. Wolf packs travel constantly in search of prey, covering roughly 9% of their territory per day, on average . The core of their territory is on average  where they spend 50% of their time. Prey density tends to be much higher on the territory's periphery. Except out of desperation, wolves tend to avoid hunting on the fringes of their range to avoid fatal confrontations with neighbouring packs. The smallest territory on record was held by a pack of six wolves in northeastern Minnesota, which occupied an estimated , while the largest was held by an Alaskan pack of ten wolves encompassing . Wolf packs are typically settled, and usually leave their accustomed ranges only during severe food shortages. Territorial fights are among the principal causes of wolf mortality, one study concluding that 14–65% of wolf deaths in Minnesota and the Denali National Park and Preserve were due to other wolves.

Communication

Wolves communicate using vocalizations, body postures, scent, touch, and taste. The phases of the moon have no effect on wolf vocalization, and despite popular belief, wolves do not howl at the moon. Wolves howl to assemble the pack usually before and after hunts, to pass on an alarm particularly at a den site, to locate each other during a storm, while crossing unfamiliar territory, and to communicate across great distances. Other vocalizations include growls, barks and whines. Wolves do not bark as loudly or continuously as dogs do in confrontations, rather barking a few times and then retreating from a perceived danger. Aggressive or self-assertive wolves are characterized by their slow and deliberate movements, high body posture and raised hackles, while submissive ones carry their bodies low, flatten their fur, and lower their ears and tail.

Scent marking involves urine, feces, and anal gland scents. This is more effective at advertising territory than howling and is often used in combination with scratch marks. Wolves increase their rate of scent marking when they encounter the marks of wolves from other packs. Lone wolves will rarely mark, but newly bonded pairs will scent mark the most. These marks are generally left every  throughout the territory on regular travelways and junctions. Such markers can last for two to three weeks, and are typically placed near rocks, boulders, trees, or the skeletons of large animals. Raised leg urination is considered to be one of the most important forms of scent communication in the wolf, making up 60–80% of all scent marks observed.

Reproduction 

Wolves are monogamous, mated pairs usually remaining together for life. Should one of the pair die, another mate is found quickly. With wolves in the wild, inbreeding does not occur where outbreeding is possible. Wolves become mature at the age of two years and sexually mature from the age of three years. The age of first breeding in wolves depends largely on environmental factors: when food is plentiful, or when wolf populations are heavily managed, wolves can rear pups at younger ages to better exploit abundant resources. Females are capable of producing pups every year, one litter annually being the average. Oestrus and rut begin in the second half of winter and lasts for two weeks.

Dens are usually constructed for pups during the summer period. When building dens, females make use of natural shelters like fissures in rocks, cliffs overhanging riverbanks and holes thickly covered by vegetation. Sometimes, the den is the appropriated burrow of smaller animals such as foxes, badgers or marmots. An appropriated den is often widened and partly remade. On rare occasions, female wolves dig burrows themselves, which are usually small and short with one to three openings. It typically faces southwards where it can be better warmed by sunlight exposure, and the snow can thaw more quickly. Resting places, play areas for the pups, and food remains are commonly found around wolf dens. The odor of urine and rotting food emanating from the denning area often attracts scavenging birds like magpies and ravens. Though they mostly avoid areas within human sight, wolves have been known to nest near domiciles, paved roads and railways. During pregnancy, female wolves remain in a den located away from the peripheral zone of their territories, where violent encounters with other packs are less likely to occur.

The gestation period lasts 62–75 days with pups usually being born in the spring months or early summer in very cold places such as on the tundra. Young females give birth to four to five young, and older females from six to eight young and up to 14. Their mortality rate is 60–80%. Newborn wolf pups look similar to German Shepherd Dog pups. They are born blind and deaf and are covered in short soft grayish-brown fur. They weigh  at birth and begin to see after nine to 12 days. The milk canines erupt after one month. Pups first leave the den after three weeks. At one-and-a-half months of age, they are agile enough to flee from danger. Mother wolves do not leave the den for the first few weeks, relying on the fathers to provide food for them and their young. Pups begin to eat solid food at the age of three to four weeks. They have a fast growth rate during their first four months of life: during this period, a pup's weight can increase nearly 30 times. Wolf pups begin play-fighting at the age of three weeks, though unlike young coyotes and foxes, their bites are gentle and controlled. Actual fights to establish hierarchy usually occur at five to eight weeks of age. This is in contrast to young coyotes and foxes, which may begin fighting even before the onset of play behaviour. By autumn, the pups are mature enough to accompany the adults on hunts for large prey.

Hunting and feeding

Single wolves or mated pairs typically have higher success rates in hunting than do large packs; single wolves have occasionally been observed to kill large prey such as moose, bison and muskoxen unaided. This contrasts with the commonly held belief that larger packs benefit from cooperative hunting to bring down large game. The size of a wolf hunting pack is related to the number of pups that survived the previous winter, adult survival, and the rate of dispersing wolves leaving the pack. The optimal pack size for hunting elk is four wolves, and for bison a large pack size is more successful.

Wolves move around their territory when hunting, using the same trails for extended periods. After snowfalls, wolves find their old trails and continue using them. These follow the banks of rivers, the shorelines of lakes, ravines overgrown with shrubs, plantations, or roads and human paths. Wolves are nocturnal predators. During the winter, a pack will commence hunting in the twilight of early evening and will hunt all night, traveling tens of kilometres. Sometimes hunting large prey occurs during the day. During the summer, wolves generally tend to hunt individually, ambushing their prey and rarely giving pursuit.

When hunting large gregarious prey, wolves will try to isolate an individual from its group. If successful, a wolf pack can bring down game that will feed it for days, but one error in judgement can lead to serious injury or death. Most large prey have developed defensive adaptations and behaviours. Wolves have been killed while attempting to bring down bison, elk, moose, muskoxen, and even by one of their smallest hoofed prey, the white-tailed deer. With smaller prey like beaver, geese, and hares, there is no risk to the wolf. Although people often believe wolves can easily overcome any of their prey, their success rate in hunting hoofed prey is usually low.

The wolf must give chase and gain on its fleeing prey, slow it down by biting through thick hair and hide, and then disable it enough to begin feeding. The wolf leaps at its quarry and tears at it. One wolf was observed being dragged for dozens of metres attached to the hind leg of a moose; another was seen being dragged over a fallen log while attached to a bull elk's nose. Wolves may wound large prey and then lie around resting for hours before killing it when it is weaker due to blood loss, thereby lessening the risk of injury to themselves. With medium-sized prey, such as roe deer or sheep, wolves kill by biting the throat, severing nerve tracks and the carotid artery, thus causing the animal to die within a few seconds to a minute. With small, mouselike prey, wolves leap in a high arc and immobilize it with their forepaws.

Once prey is brought down, wolves begin to feed excitedly, ripping and tugging at the carcass in all directions, and bolting down large chunks of it. The breeding pair typically monopolizes food to continue producing pups. When food is scarce, this is done at the expense of other family members, especially non-pups. The breeding pair typically eats first. They usually work the hardest at killing prey, and may rest after a long hunt and allow the rest of the family to eat undisturbed. Once the breeding pair has finished eating, the rest of the family tears off pieces of the carcass and transports them to secluded areas where they can eat in peace. Wolves typically commence feeding by gorging on the larger internal organs, like the heart, liver, lungs, and stomach lining. The kidneys and spleen are eaten once they are exposed, followed by the muscles. A wolf can eat 15–19% of its body weight in one sitting.

Infections

Viral and bacterial 

Viral diseases carried by wolves include: rabies, canine distemper, canine parvovirus, infectious canine hepatitis, papillomatosis, and canine coronavirus. Wolves are a major host for rabies in Russia, Iran, Afghanistan, Iraq and India. In wolves, the incubation period is eight to 21 days, and results in the host becoming agitated, deserting its pack, and travelling up to  a day, thus increasing the risk of infecting other wolves. Infected wolves do not show any fear of humans, most documented wolf attacks on people being attributed to rabid animals. Although canine distemper is lethal in dogs, it has not been recorded to kill wolves, except in Canada and Alaska. The canine parvovirus, which causes death by dehydration, electrolyte imbalance, and endotoxic shock or sepsis, is largely survivable in wolves, but can be lethal to pups. Wolves may catch infectious canine hepatitis from dogs, though there are no records of wolves dying from it. Papillomatosis has been recorded only once in wolves, and likely does not cause serious illness or death, though it may alter feeding behaviours. The canine coronavirus has been recorded in Alaskan wolves, infections being most prevalent in winter months.

Bacterial diseases carried by wolves include: brucellosis, Lyme disease, leptospirosis, tularemia, bovine tuberculosis, listeriosis and anthrax. Wolves can catch Brucella suis from wild and domestic reindeer. While adult wolves tend not to show any clinical signs, it can severely weaken the pups of infected females. Although lyme disease can debilitate individual wolves, it does not appear to significantly affect wolf populations. Leptospirosis can be contracted through contact with infected prey or urine, and can cause fever, anorexia, vomiting, anemia, hematuria, icterus, and death. Wolves living near farms are more vulnerable to the disease than those living in the wilderness, probably because of prolonged contact with infected domestic animal waste. Wolves may catch tularemia from lagomorph prey, though its effect on wolves is unknown. Although bovine tuberculosis is not considered a major threat to wolves, it has been recorded to have killed two wolf pups in Canada.

Parasitic 

Wolves carry ectoparasites and endoparasites; those in the former Soviet Union have been recorded to carry at least 50 species. Most of these parasites infect wolves without adverse effects, though the effects may become more serious in sick or malnourished specimens. Parasitic infection in wolves is of particular concern to people. Wolves can spread them to dogs, which in turn can carry the parasites to humans. In areas where wolves inhabit pastoral areas, the parasites can be spread to livestock.

Wolves are often infested with a variety of arthropod exoparasites, including fleas, ticks, lice, and mites. The most harmful to wolves, particularly pups, is the mange mite (Sarcoptes scabiei), though they rarely develop full-blown mange, unlike foxes. Lice, such as Trichodectes canis, may cause sickness in wolves, but rarely death. Ticks of the genus Ixodes can infect wolves with Lyme disease and Rocky Mountain spotted fever. The tick Dermacentor pictus also infests wolves. Other ectoparasites include chewing lice, sucking lice and the fleas Pulex irritans and Ctenocephalides canis.

Endoparasites known to infect wolves include: protozoans and helminths (flukes, tapeworms, roundworms and thorny-headed worms). Of 30,000 protozoan species, only a few have been recorded to infect wolves: Isospora, Toxoplasma, Sarcocystis, Babesia, and Giardia. Some wolves carry Neospora caninum, which can be spread to cattle and is correlated with bovine miscarriages. Among flukes, the most common in North American wolves is Alaria, which infects small rodents and amphibians which are eaten by wolves. Upon reaching maturity, Alaria migrates to the wolf's intestine, but does little harm. Metorchis conjunctus, which enters wolves through eating fish, infects the wolf's liver or gall bladder, causing liver disease, inflammation of the pancreas, and emaciation. Most other fluke species reside in the wolf's intestine, though Paragonimus westermani lives in the lungs. Tapeworms are commonly found in wolves, as their primary hosts are ungulates, small mammals, and fish, which wolves feed upon. Tapeworms generally cause little harm in wolves, though this depends on the number and size of the parasites, and the sensitivity of the host. Symptoms often include constipation, toxic and allergic reactions, irritation of the intestinal mucosa, and malnutrition. Infections by the tapeworm Echinococcus granulosus in ungulate populations tend to increase in areas with high wolf densities, as wolves can shed Echinoccocus eggs in their feces onto grazing areas.

Wolves can carry over 30 roundworm species, though most roundworm infections appear benign, depending on the number of worms and the age of the host. Ancylostoma caninum attaches itself on the intestinal wall to feed on the host's blood, and can cause hyperchromic anemia, emaciation, diarrhea, and possibly death. Toxocara canis, a hookworm known to infect wolf pups in the uterus, can cause intestinal irritation, bloating, vomiting, and diarrhea. D. renale causes the complete destruction of the kidney's functional tissue and can be fatal if both kidneys are infected. Wolves can tolerate low levels of Dirofilaria immitis for many years without showing any ill effects, though high levels can kill wolves through cardiac enlargement and congestive hepatopathy. Wolves probably become infected with Trichinella spiralis by eating infected ungulates. Although T. spiralis is not known to produce clinical signs in wolves, it can cause emaciation, salivation, and crippling muscle pains in dogs. Thorny-headed worms rarely infect wolves, though three species have been identified in Russian wolves: Nicolla skrjabini, Macracanthorhynchus catulinus, and Moniliformis moniliformis.

Status and conservation 

The global wild wolf population in 2003 was estimated at 300,000. Wolf population declines have been arrested since the 1970s. This has fostered recolonization and reintroduction in parts of its former range as a result of legal protection, changes in land use, and rural human population shifts to cities. Competition with humans for livestock and game species, concerns over the danger posed by wolves to people, and habitat fragmentation pose a continued threat to the wolf. Despite these threats, the IUCN classifies the wolf as Least Concern on its Red List due to its relatively widespread range and stable population. The species is listed under AppendixII of the Convention on International Trade in Endangered Species of Wild Fauna and Flora (CITES), meaning international trade in the species (including parts and derivatives) is regulated. However, populations of Bhutan, India, Nepal and Pakistan are listed in AppendixI which prohibits commercial international trade in wild-sourced specimens.

North America 

In Canada, 50,000–60,000 wolves live in 80% of their historical range, making Canada an important stronghold for the species. Under Canadian law, First Nations people can hunt wolves without restrictions, but others must acquire licenses for the hunting and trapping seasons. As many as 4,000 wolves may be harvested in Canada each year. The wolf is a protected species in national parks under the Canada National Parks Act. In Alaska, 7,000–11,000 wolves are found on 85% of the state's  area. Wolves may be hunted or trapped with a license; around 1,200 wolves are harvested annually.

In the contiguous United States, wolf declines were caused by the expansion of agriculture, the decimation of the wolf's main prey species like the American bison, and extermination campaigns. Wolves were given protection under the Endangered Species Act (ESA) of 1973, and have since returned to parts of their former range thanks to both natural recolonizations and reintroductions in Yellowstone and Idaho. The repopulation of wolves in Midwestern United States has been concentrated in the Great Lakes states of Minnesota, Wisconsin and Michigan where wolves number over 4,000 as of 2018. Wolves also occupy much of the northern Rocky Mountains region, with at least 1,704 wolves in Montana, Idaho and Wyoming as of 2015. They have also established populations in Washington and Oregon. In Mexico and parts of the southwestern United States, the Mexican and U.S. governments collaborated from 1977 to 1980 in capturing all Mexican wolves remaining in the wild to prevent their extinction and established captive breeding programs for reintroduction. As of 2022, the reintroduced Mexican wolf population numbers at least 241 individuals across New Mexico and Arizona, with an additional 45 across Sonora and Chihuahua.

Eurasia 

Europe, excluding Russia, Belarus and Ukraine, has 17,000 wolves in more than 28 countries. In many countries of the European Union, the wolf is strictly protected under the 1979 Berne Convention on the Conservation of European Wildlife and Natural Habitats (AppendixII) and the 1992 Council Directive 92/43/EEC on the Conservation of Natural Habitats and of Wild Fauna and Flora (AnnexII andIV). There is extensive legal protection in many European countries, although there are national exceptions.

Wolves have been persecuted in Europe for centuries, having been exterminated in Great Britain by 1684, in Ireland by 1770, in Central Europe by 1899, in France by the 1930s, and in much of Scandinavia by the early 1970s. They continued to survive in parts of Finland, Eastern Europe and Southern Europe. Since 1980, European wolves have rebounded and expanded into parts of their former range. The decline of the traditional pastoral and rural economies seems to have ended the need to exterminate the wolf in parts of Europe. As of 2016, estimates of wolf numbers include: 4,000 in the Balkans, 3,460–3,849 in the Carpathian Mountains, 1,700–2,240 in the Baltic states, 1,100–2,400 in the Italian peninsula, and around 2,500 in the northwest Iberian peninsula as of 2007.

In the former Soviet Union, wolf populations have retained much of their historical range despite Soviet-era large scale extermination campaigns. Their numbers range from 1,500 in Georgia, to 20,000 in Kazakhstan and up to 45,000 in Russia. In Russia, the wolf is regarded as a pest because of its attacks on livestock, and wolf management means controlling their numbers by destroying them throughout the year. Russian history over the past century shows that reduced hunting leads to an abundance of wolves. The Russian government has continued to pay bounties for wolves and annual harvests of 20–30% do not appear to significantly affect their numbers.

In the Middle East, only Israel and Oman give wolves explicit legal protection. Israel has protected its wolves since 1954 and has maintained a moderately sized population of 150 through effective enforcement of conservation policies. These wolves have moved into neighboring countries. Approximately 300–600 wolves inhabit the Arabian Peninsula. The wolf also appears to be widespread in Iran. Turkey has an estimated population of about 7,000 wolves. Outside of Turkey, wolf populations in the Middle East may total 1,000–2,000.

In southern Asia, the northern regions of Afghanistan and Pakistan are important strongholds for wolves. The wolf has been protected in India since 1972. The Indian wolf is distributed across the states of Gujarat, Rajasthan, Haryana, Uttar Pradesh, Madhya Pradesh, Maharashtra, Karnataka and Andhra Pradesh. As of 2019, it is estimated that there are around 2,000–3,000 Indian wolves in the country. In East Asia, Mongolia's population numbers 10,000–20,000. In China, Heilongjiang has roughly 650 wolves, Xinjiang has 10,000 and Tibet has 2,000. 2017 evidence suggests that wolves range across all of mainland China. Wolves have been historically persecuted in China but have been legally protected since 1998. The last Japanese wolf was captured and killed in 1905.

Relationships with humans

In culture

In folklore, religion and mythology 

The wolf is a common motif in the mythologies and cosmologies of peoples throughout its historical range. The Ancient Greeks associated wolves with Apollo, the god of light and order. The Ancient Romans connected the wolf with their god of war and agriculture Mars, and believed their city's founders, Romulus and Remus, were suckled by a she-wolf. Norse mythology includes the feared giant wolf Fenrir, and Geri and Freki, Odin's faithful pets.

In Chinese astronomy, the wolf represents Sirius and guards the heavenly gate. In China, the wolf was traditionally associated with greed and cruelty and wolf epithets were used to describe negative behaviours such as cruelty ("wolf's heart"), mistrust ("wolf's look") and lechery ("wolf-sex"). In both Hinduism and Buddhism, the wolf is ridden by gods of protection. In Vedic Hinduism, the wolf is a symbol of the night and the daytime quail must escape from its jaws. In Tantric Buddhism, wolves are depicted as inhabitants of graveyards and destroyers of corpses.

In the Pawnee creation myth, the wolf was the first animal brought to Earth. When humans killed it, they were punished with death, destruction and the loss of immortality. For the Pawnee, Sirius is the "wolf star" and its disappearance and reappearance signified the wolf moving to and from the spirit world. Both Pawnee and Blackfoot call the Milky Way the "wolf trail". The  wolf is also an important crest symbol for clans of the Pacific Northwest like the Kwakwakaʼwakw.

The concept of people turning into wolves, and the inverse, has been present in many cultures. One Greek myth tells of Lycaon being transformed into a wolf by Zeus as punishment for his evil deeds. The legend of the werewolf has been widespread in European folklore and involves people willingly turning into wolves to attack and kill others. The Navajo have traditionally believed that witches would turn into wolves by donning wolf skins and would kill people and raid graveyards. The Dena'ina believed wolves were once men and viewed them as brothers.

In fable and literature 

Aesop featured wolves in several of his fables, playing on the concerns of Ancient Greece's settled, sheep-herding world. His most famous is the fable of "The Boy Who Cried Wolf", which is directed at those who knowingly raise false alarms, and from which the idiomatic phrase "to cry wolf" is derived. Some of his other fables concentrate on maintaining the trust between shepherds and guard dogs in their vigilance against wolves, as well as anxieties over the close relationship between wolves and dogs. Although Aesop used wolves to warn, criticize and moralize about human behaviour, his portrayals added to the wolf's image as a deceitful and dangerous animal. The Bible uses an image of a wolf lying with a lamb in a utopian vision of the future. In the New Testament, Jesus is said to have used wolves as illustrations of the dangers his followers, whom he represents as sheep, would face should they follow him.
 
Isengrim the wolf, a character first appearing in the 12th-century Latin poem Ysengrimus, is a major character in the Reynard Cycle, where he stands for the low nobility, whilst his adversary, Reynard the fox, represents the peasant hero. Isengrim is forever the victim of Reynard's wit and cruelty, often dying at the end of each story. The tale of "Little Red Riding Hood", first written in 1697 by Charles Perrault, is considered to have further contributed to the wolf's negative reputation in the Western world. The Big Bad Wolf is portrayed as a villain capable of imitating human speech and disguising itself with human clothing. The character has been interpreted as an allegorical sexual predator. Villainous wolf characters also appear in The Three Little Pigs and "The Wolf and the Seven Young Goats". The hunting of wolves, and their attacks on humans and livestock, feature prominently in Russian literature, and are included in the works of Leo Tolstoy, Anton Chekhov, Nikolay Nekrasov, Ivan Bunin, Leonid Pavlovich Sabaneyev, and others. Tolstoy's War and Peace and Chekhov's Peasants both feature scenes in which wolves are hunted with hounds and Borzois. The musical Peter and the Wolf involves a wolf being captured for eating a duck, but is spared and sent to a zoo.

Wolves are among the central characters of Rudyard Kipling's The Jungle Book. His portrayal of wolves has been praised posthumously by wolf biologists for his depiction of them: rather than being villainous or gluttonous, as was common in wolf portrayals at the time of the book's publication, they are shown as living in amiable family groups and drawing on the experience of infirm but experienced elder pack members. Farley Mowat's largely fictional 1963 memoir Never Cry Wolf is widely considered to be the most popular book on wolves, having been adapted into a Hollywood film and taught in several schools decades after its publication. Although credited with having changed popular perceptions on wolves by portraying them as loving, cooperative and noble, it has been criticized for its idealization of wolves and its factual inaccuracies.

Conflicts 

Human presence appears to stress wolves, as seen by increased cortisol levels in instances such as snowmobiling near their territory.

Predation on livestock 

Livestock depredation has been one of the primary reasons for hunting wolves and can pose a severe problem for wolf conservation. As well as causing economic losses, the threat of wolf predation causes great stress on livestock producers, and no foolproof solution of preventing such attacks short of exterminating wolves has been found. Some nations help offset economic losses to wolves through compensation programs or state insurance. Domesticated animals are easy prey for wolves, as they have been bred under constant human protection, and are thus unable to defend themselves very well. Wolves typically resort to attacking livestock when wild prey is depleted. In Eurasia, a large part of the diet of some wolf populations consists of livestock, while such incidents are rare in North America, where healthy populations of wild prey have been largely restored.

The majority of losses occur during the summer grazing period, untended livestock in remote pastures being the most vulnerable to wolf predation. The most frequently targeted livestock species are sheep (Europe), domestic reindeer (northern Scandinavia), goats (India), horses (Mongolia), cattle and turkeys (North America). The number of animals killed in single attacks varies according to species: most attacks on cattle and horses result in one death, while turkeys, sheep and domestic reindeer may be killed in surplus. Wolves mainly attack livestock when the animals are grazing, though they occasionally break into fenced enclosures.

Competition with dogs 

A review of the studies on the competitive effects of dogs on sympatric carnivores did not mention any research on competition between dogs and wolves. Competition would favour the wolf, which is known to kill dogs; however, wolves usually live in pairs or in small packs in areas with high human persecution, giving them a disadvantage when facing large groups of dogs.

Wolves kill dogs on occasion, and some wolf populations rely on dogs as an important food source. In Croatia, wolves kill more dogs than sheep, and wolves in Russia appear to limit stray dog populations. Wolves may display unusually bold behaviour when attacking dogs accompanied by people, sometimes ignoring nearby humans. Wolf attacks on dogs may occur both in house yards and in forests. Wolf attacks on hunting dogs are considered a major problem in Scandinavia and Wisconsin. The most frequently killed hunting breeds in Scandinavia are Harriers, older animals being most at risk, likely because they are less timid than younger animals, and react to the presence of wolves differently. Large hunting dogs such as Swedish Elkhounds are more likely to survive wolf attacks because of their better ability to defend themselves.

Although the number of dogs killed each year by wolves is relatively low, it induces a fear of wolves entering villages and farmyards to prey on them. In many cultures, dogs are seen as family members, or at least working team members, and losing one can lead to strong emotional responses such as demanding more liberal hunting regulations.

Dogs that are employed to guard sheep help to mitigate human–wolf conflicts, and are often proposed as one of the non-lethal tools in the conservation of wolves. Shepherd dogs are not particularly aggressive, but they can disrupt potential wolf predation by displaying what is to the wolf ambiguous behaviours, such as barking, social greeting, invitation to play or aggression. The historical use of shepherd dogs across Eurasia has been effective against wolf predation, especially when confining sheep in the presence of several livestock guardian dogs. Shepherd dogs are sometimes killed by wolves.

Attacks on humans 

The fear of wolves has been pervasive in many societies, though humans are not part of the wolf's natural prey. How wolves react to humans depends largely on their prior experience with people: wolves lacking any negative experience of humans, or which are food-conditioned, may show little fear of people. Although wolves may react aggressively when provoked, such attacks are mostly limited to quick bites on extremities, and the attacks are not pressed.

Predatory attacks may be preceded by a long period of habituation, in which wolves gradually lose their fear of humans. The victims are repeatedly bitten on the head and face, and are then dragged off and consumed unless the wolves are driven off. Such attacks typically occur only locally and do not stop until the wolves involved are eliminated. Predatory attacks can occur at any time of the year, with a peak in the June–August period, when the chances of people entering forested areas (for livestock grazing or berry and mushroom picking) increase. Cases of non-rabid wolf attacks in winter have been recorded in Belarus, Kirov and Irkutsk oblasts, Karelia and Ukraine. Also, wolves with pups experience greater food stresses during this period. The majority of victims of predatory wolf attacks are children under the age of 18 and, in the rare cases where adults are killed, the victims are almost always women. Indian wolves have a history of preying on children, a phenomenon called "child-lifting". They may be taken primarily in the spring and summer periods during the evening hours, and often within human settlements.

Cases of rabid wolves are low when compared to other species, as wolves do not serve as primary reservoirs of the disease, but can be infected by animals such as dogs, jackals and foxes. Incidents of rabies in wolves are very rare in North America, though numerous in the eastern Mediterranean, the Middle East and Central Asia. Wolves apparently develop the "furious" phase of rabies to a very high degree. This, coupled with their size and strength, makes rabid wolves perhaps the most dangerous of rabid animals. Bites from rabid wolves are 15 times more dangerous than those of rabid dogs. Rabid wolves usually act alone, travelling large distances and often biting large numbers of people and domestic animals. Most rabid wolf attacks occur in the spring and autumn periods. Unlike with predatory attacks, the victims of rabid wolves are not eaten, and the attacks generally occur only on a single day. The victims are chosen at random, though most cases involve adult men. During the fifty years up to 2002, there were eight fatal attacks in Europe and Russia, and more than two hundred in southern Asia.

Human hunting of wolves 

Theodore Roosevelt said wolves are difficult to hunt because of their elusiveness, sharp senses, high endurance, and ability to quickly incapacitate and kill hunting dogs. Historic methods included killing of spring-born litters in their dens, coursing with dogs (usually combinations of sighthounds, Bloodhounds and Fox Terriers), poisoning with strychnine, and trapping.

A popular method of wolf hunting in Russia involves trapping a pack within a small area by encircling it with fladry poles carrying a human scent. This method relies heavily on the wolf's fear of human scents, though it can lose its effectiveness when wolves become accustomed to the odor. Some hunters can lure wolves by imitating their calls. In Kazakhstan and Mongolia, wolves are traditionally hunted with eagles and falcons, though this practice is declining, as experienced falconers are becoming few in number. Shooting wolves from aircraft is highly effective, due to increased visibility and direct lines of fire. Several types of dog, including the Borzoi and Kyrgyz Tajgan, have been specifically bred for wolf hunting.

As pets and working animals 

Wolves and wolf-dog hybrids are sometimes kept as exotic pets. Although closely related to domestic dogs, wolves do not show the same tractability as dogs in living alongside humans, being generally less responsive to human commands and more likely to act aggressively. A person is more likely to be fatally mauled by a pet wolf or wolf-dog hybrid than by a dog.

Notes

References

Bibliography

External links 

The International Wolf Center
Staying Safe in Wolf Country, ADFG (January 2009)
Watch Death of a Legend and Cry of the Wild by Bill Mason

Apex predators
Articles containing video clips
Mammals of Asia
Mammals of Europe
Mammals of North America
Extant Middle Pleistocene first appearances
Holarctic fauna
Mammals described in 1758
Paraphyletic groups
Pleistocene carnivorans
Scavengers
Taxa named by Carl Linnaeus
Wolves